The Shire of Alexandra was a local government area located about  northeast of Melbourne, the state capital of Victoria, Australia.

History

Alexandra was first incorporated as a road district on 30 June 1868, and became a shire on 3 September 1869. Its boundaries changed a number of times throughout its existence:
 20 May 1914 - annexed part of the North Riding of the Shire of Yea;
 1 October 1963 - part of the shire annexed to the Shire of Euroa;
 1 October 1963 - annexed part of the Shire of Healesville, around Buxton;
 1 October 1984 - annexed the East Riding of the Shire of Healesville, around Marysville;

On 18 November 1994, the Shire of Alexandra was abolished, and along with the Shire of Yea and parts of the City of Whittlesea and the Shires of Broadford, Eltham, Euroa and Healesville, was merged into the newly created Shire of Murrindindi.

Wards

The Shire of Alexandra was divided into three ridings on 3 August 1985, each of which elected three councillors. Prior to this, it was divided into five ridings in May 1957.

 Central Riding
 North East Riding
 South Riding

Towns and localities
 Acheron
 Alexandra*
 Buxton (transferred from the Shire of Healesville in 1963)
 Cathkin
 Eildon
 Fawcett
 Gobur
 Kanumbra
 Koriella
 Marysville (transferred from the Shire of Healesville in 1984)
 Narbethong (transferred from the Shire of Healesville in 1984)
 Rubicon
 St Filians
 Snobs Creek
 Taggerty
 Thornton
 Yarck

* Council seat.

Population

* Estimate in the 1958 Victorian Year Book.

References

External links
 Victorian Places - Alexandra and Alexandra Shire

Alexandra